Grupa-Osiedle  is a village in the administrative district of Gmina Dragacz, within Świecie County, Kuyavian-Pomeranian Voivodeship, in north-central Poland.

The village has a population of 1,646.

References

Grupa-Osiedle